The  are a collection of Buddhist temples in southern Gifu Prefecture, Japan. The name is derived from Mino Province, the former name for the area. The list was originally created during the mid-Edo period.

Thirty-three Kannon

Tōkai Hundred Kannon
The Mino Thirty-three Kannon combine with the Owari Thirty-three Kannon in western Aichi Prefecture, the Mikawa Thirty-three Kannon in eastern Aichi Prefecture and Toyokawa Inari to form the Tōkai Hundred Kannon.

See also 
Tōkai Hundred Kannon
Owari Thirty-three Kannon
Toyokawa Inari
Glossary of Japanese Buddhism, for an explanation of terms concerning Japanese Buddhism

External links
Tōkai Hundred Kannon: Mino Seigoku Thirty-three Kannon Reijō-kai

References

Buddhist temples in Gifu Prefecture